Arthur E. Meyerhoff (1895–1986) was an advertising agency executive and entrepreneur. He was born in Chicago, Illinois.

Meyerhoff died in 1986; services were held at the Fourth Presbyterian Church in Rancho Santa Fe, California.

References

American advertising executives
All-American Girls Professional Baseball League
Baseball executives
Businesspeople from Chicago
1895 births
1986 deaths
20th-century American businesspeople